Greenfield Township is one of seventeen townships in Grundy County, Illinois, USA.  As of the 2010 census, its population was 997 and it contained 441 housing units.

History
Villages remain part of the township.

On 10 March 1903, Garfield Township was separated from Greenfield Township. The southeastern portion of the village of Gardner, which is located mainly within Garfield Township, is in Greenfield Township. Garfield was begun centered at an intersection in 18__ prior to the township division.

The social and economic factors which led to the division of the township in 1905 have changed. Modern transportation, technological advances and familial relationships have led to increased cohesiveness between the five main communities within the two townships in the twenty-first century. The high schools are focal points of activity for the entire area. The villages are in many respects neighborhoods within the townships.

Geography

Cities, towns, villages
 East Brooklyn
 Gardner (southeast edge)
 South Wilmington

Major highways
  Illinois Route 17
  Illinois Route 53

Demographics

School districts
 Herscher Community Unit School District 2
 Gardner-South Wilmington High School District #73

Political districts
 Illinois' 11th congressional district
 State House District 75
 State Senate District 38

References
 
 United States Census Bureau 2007 TIGER/Line Shapefiles
 United States National Atlas

External links
 City-Data.com
 Illinois State Archives

Townships in Grundy County, Illinois
Townships in Illinois
1849 establishments in Illinois